Uppalapati Surya Narayana Raju was an Indian film producer. He is the younger brother of Krishnam Raju and father of Prabhas. His movie banner is Gopi Krishna Movies and he is the  producer of Bhakta Kannappa.

Personal life
Suryanarayana Raju was born in Mogalthur, West Godavari District, Andhra Pradesh, to Veera Venkata Satyanarayana Raju.

Filmography

As Producer

References 

Telugu film producers
Hindi film producers
People from West Godavari district
Year of birth missing
2010 deaths
Film producers from Andhra Pradesh